John Quniaq Baker (born 1962 or 1963 in Kotzebue, Alaska) is self-employed American dog musher, pilot and motivational speaker of Inupiat descent who consistently places in the top 10 during the long distance Iditarod Trail Sled Dog Race. Baker won the 2011 Iditarod with a finish time of 8 Days 19 Hours 46 Minutes 39 Seconds. 

Baker started mushing at age 14. He raced in his first Iditarod in 1996, placing 22nd. By his third race he placed in the top 10, and he sustained that position for six of the next seven years (from the 1998 to the 2005 Iditarods), only dropping to 22nd once again in 2000 due to dog trouble. His second best finish was in 2002, when he crossed the finish line in 3rd place in 9 days, 5 hours, 46 minutes, and 30 seconds. In 1998, he won both the Dorothy G. Page Halfway Award and the Regal Alaskan's First Musher to the Yukon Award. He has competed in every race from the 1996 to the 2013 Iditarod. In the 2009 Iditarod, he finished in 3rd place. He has 24 dogs. 
Baker worked as a pilot and manager of his family's air taxi business. He also visits local schools as a motivational lecturer. Like Ramy Brooks, Baker is one of the few Alaska Native dog sled racers who compete in the modern Iditarod.

Baker lives near his extended family on the coast of the Chukchi Sea in Kotzebue, Alaska, and has a fish camp/winter cabin 30 mi (50 km) away, across Kobuk Lake.  His son Alex has competed in the Junior Iditarod. He also has a daughter, Tahayla. As of March 2017, Baker is engaged to fellow musher Katherine Keith; the couple run four businesses and two nonprofit organizations in the Kotzebue region. They plan to marry after both run in the 2018 Iditarod.

Personal life
Baker is of Inupiat and Jewish heritage. His grandmother, Clara Rotman (née Levy), was born in Kiana, Alaska in 1914. She was born to a Native Alaskan mother and a Jewish father and was raised Jewish and cherished her Jewish heritage. In 2011, Baker became the first Jew and the first Inuit to win the Iditarod.

Notes

References 
 Alaska Dispatch article on Baker's historic win in 2011 Retrieved March 15, 2011
 Anonymous (2006). "Iditarod Musher Biography: John Baker (Bib 56)". Cabela's Iditarod 2006 Race Coverage. Retrieved March 6, 2006.
 Anonymous (October 29, 2001). "John Baker: Kotzebue, Alaska". Dogsled.com. Retrieved March 6, 2006.
 Potempa, Ann (February 22, 2001). "John Baker returns to Iditarod for another try". Anchorage Daily News. Retrieved March 6, 2006. (copy in Google cache)

External links

 Current statistics in the 2006 Iditarod from the official website
 Team John Baker

1960s births
20th-century American Jews
Aviators from Alaska
Dog mushers from Alaska
Iditarod champions
Inupiat people
Living people
Native American sportspeople
People from Northwest Arctic Borough, Alaska
Year of birth uncertain
21st-century American Jews